The 1979–80 UCLA Bruins men's basketball team represented the University of California, Los Angeles in the 1979–80 NCAA Division I men's basketball season.  Larry Brown began his first year as head coach. The Bruins started the season ranked 8th in the nation (AP Poll). The Bruins started the season 3-0 and climbed to 7th after starting 3–0. UCLA's team finished 4th in the Pac-10 regular season, failing to finish atop the conference for the first time since 1965–66. UCLA participated the NCAA tournament going 5-0 before losing to the Louisville Cardinals in the championship game. The Bruins' five NCAA tournament wins and championship game appearance were later vacated after the NCAA had determined UCLA committed nine violations.

The Bruins fell out the rankings in the poll released on January 14, 1980, ending what currently stands as the second most consecutive weeks ranked in the AP poll with 221. The streak began at the beginning of the Bruins 1966–67 season.

Starting lineup

Roster

Schedule

|-
!colspan=9 style=|Regular Season

|-
!colspan=12 style="background:#;"| NCAA Tournament

Source

Notes
 Adding in the NCAA Tournament opponents, UCLA played eleven teams ranked in the AP Top-20 (at the time). This was over one-third of all opponents (11 of 32).
 UCLA beat #1 Depaul in the NCAA Tournament. This was the second consecutive year that UCLA had beaten a #1 team (either during the season or in the tournament).
 All 5 UCLA victories in the tournament and the championship loss were vacated by the NCAA for 9 infractions. They were also placed on two years' probation, which included a one-year NCAA tournament ban and an order to vacate its 1980 NCAA tournament appearance.

References

UCLA Bruins men's basketball seasons
Ucla
NCAA Division I men's basketball tournament Final Four seasons
Ucla
1979 in sports in California
UCLA